Frederick Steven Roach (born March 5, 1960) is an American boxing trainer and former professional boxer. Roach is widely regarded as one of the best boxing trainers of all time. He is the enduring boxing coach of the eight-division world champion Manny Pacquiao, five-time and four-division world champion Miguel Cotto, former WBC middleweight champion Julio César Chávez Jr., three-time world champion James Toney, former UFC middleweight and three-time welterweight champion Georges St-Pierre, as well as top prospects Jose Benavidez, Peter Quillin, and Vanes Martirosyan. Roach was the trainer of two-time women's world champion Lucia Rijker. He has also trained former light welterweight champion Amir Khan.

Early life and boxing career
Roach was trained by his father Paul Roach at a young age along with his brothers Joey and Pepper. In an interview with Dan Patrick on the AUDIENCE channel, Roach disclosed that throughout his youth, he was involved in over 300 street fights. Fearing for his own safety in one fight, he claims to have bitten another man's eye out in self-defense.

As a teenager, he was a dominant force in the New England amateur and AAU ranks.  Roach turned pro in 1978, fighting as a lightweight and won his first 10 bouts. Roach trained under Eddie Futch and went 26–1 before appearing in a historic match at the Boston Garden on June 11, 1982. The card that night was the first of two times that all three Fighting Roach Brothers appeared at the same time. Brothers Joey and Pepper won their undercard bouts but in the main event, Freddie lost a unanimous decision to Rafael Lopez. Freddie would rebound and go on to contend twice for regional championships. 
   
Late in his career, Roach, who was known for being able to take on a barrage of punches, began showing early signs of Parkinson's disease. Futch asked Roach to retire but the boxer refused and continued to fight with his father as his trainer. He went on to lose five of his last six fights before retiring at age 26. His best payday was $7,500.

Professional boxing record

| style="text-align:center;" colspan="8"|40 Wins (15 knockouts, 25 decisions),  13 Losses (3 knockouts, 10 decisions), 0 Draws
|-  style="text-align:center; background:#e3e3e3;"
|  style="border-style:none none solid solid; "|Res.
|  style="border-style:none none solid solid; "|Record
|  style="border-style:none none solid solid; "|Opponent
|  style="border-style:none none solid solid; "|Type
|  style="border-style:none none solid solid; "|Rd., Time
|  style="border-style:none none solid solid; "|Date
|  style="border-style:none none solid solid; "|Location
|  style="border-style:none none solid solid; "|Notes
|- align=center
|Loss
|align=center|40–13||align=left| David Rivello
|
|
|
|align=left|
|align=left|
|- align=center
|Win
|align=center|40–12||align=left| Arnel Arrozal
|
|
|
|align=left|
|align=left|
|- align=center
|Loss
|align=center|39–12||align=left| Andy Nance
|
|
|
|align=left|
|align=left|
|- align=center
|Loss
|align=center|39–11||align=left| Darryl Tyson
|
|
|
|align=left|
|align=left|
|- align=center
|Loss
|align=center|39–10||align=left| Héctor Camacho
|
|
|
|align=left|
|align=left|
|- align=center
|Loss
|align=center|39–9||align=left| Greg Haugen
|
|
|
|align=left|
|align=left|
|- align=center
|Win
|align=center|39–8||align=left| Joey Olivera
|
|
|
|align=left|
|align=left|
|- align=center
|Win
|align=center|38–8||align=left| Martin Morado
|
|
|
|align=left|
|align=left|
|- align=center
|Win
|align=center|37–8||align=left| Jaime Balboa
|
|
|
|align=left|
|align=left|
|- align=center
|Loss
|align=center|36–8||align=left| Bobby Chacon
|
|
|
|align=left|
|align=left|
|- align=center
|Loss
|align=center|36–7||align=left| Efrain Nieves
|
|
|
|align=left|
|align=left|
|- align=center
|Win
|align=center|36–6||align=left| Richie Foster
|
|
|
|align=left|
|align=left|
|- align=center
|Win
|align=center|35–6||align=left| Joe Ruelaz
|
|
|
|align=left|
|align=left|
|- align=center
|Loss
|align=center|34–6||align=left| Tommy Cordova
|
|
|
|align=left|
|align=left|
|- align=center
|Win
|align=center|34–5||align=left| Efrain Nieves
|
|
|
|align=left|
|align=left|
|- align=center
|Win
|align=center|33–5||align=left| Delio Palacios
|
|
|
|align=left|
|align=left|
|- align=center
|Loss
|align=center|32–5||align=left| Louis Burke
|
|
|
|align=left|
|align=left|
|- align=center
|Win
|align=center|32–4||align=left| Carlos Bryant
|
|
|
|align=left|
|align=left|
|- align=center
|Win
|align=center|31–4||align=left| Reynaldo Zaragoza
|
|
|
|align=left|
|align=left|
|- align=center
|Loss
|align=center|30–4||align=left| Louis Burke
|
|
|
|align=left|
|align=left|
|- align=center
|Win
|align=center|30–3||align=left| Bobby Pappion
|
|
|
|align=left|
|align=left|
|- align=center
|Win
|align=center|29–3||align=left| Danny Cruz
|
|
|
|align=left|
|align=left|
|- align=center
|Win
|align=center|28–3||align=left| Danny Cruz
|
|
|
|align=left|
|align=left|
|- align=center
|Win
|align=center|27–3||align=left| Martin Galvan
|
|
|
|align=left|
|align=left|
|- align=center
|Loss
|align=center|26–3||align=left| Lenny Valdez
|
|
|
|align=left|
|align=left|
|- align=center
|Loss
|align=center|26–2||align=left| Rafael Lopez
|
|
|
|align=left|
|align=left|
|- align=center
|Win
|align=center|26–1||align=left| Juan Veloz
|
|
|
|align=left|
|align=left|
|- align=center
|Win
|align=center|25–1||align=left| Herman Ingram
|
|
|
|align=left|
|align=left|
|- align=center
|Win
|align=center|24–1||align=left| Mario Chavez
|
|
|
|align=left|
|align=left|
|- align=center
|Win
|align=center|23–1||align=left| Jose Resendez
|
|
|
|align=left|
|align=left|
|- align=center
|Win
|align=center|22–1||align=left| Javier Flores
|
|
|
|align=left|
|align=left|
|- align=center
|Win
|align=center|21–1||align=left| David Capo
|
|
|
|align=left|
|align=left|
|- align=center
|Win
|align=center|20–1||align=left| Joe Phillips
|
|
|
|align=left|
|align=left|
|- align=center
|Win
|align=center|19–1||align=left| Jose Resendez
|
|
|
|align=left|
|align=left|
|- align=center
|Win
|align=center|18–1||align=left| Pedro Gonzalez
|
|
|
|align=left|
|align=left|
|- align=center
|Win
|align=center|17–1||align=left| Jose Resendez
|
|
|
|align=left|
|align=left|
|- align=center
|Win
|align=center|16–1||align=left| Manuel Martinez
|
|
|
|align=left|
|align=left|
|- align=center
|Win
|align=center|15–1||align=left| Lionel Harney
|
|
|
|align=left|
|align=left|
|- align=center
|Win
|align=center|14–1||align=left| Billy Martinez 
|
|
|
|align=left|
|align=left|
|- align=center
|Win
|align=center|13–1||align=left| Roberto Flores
|
|
|
|align=left|
|align=left|
|- align=center
|Win
|align=center|12–1||align=left| Luis Avila
|
|
|
|align=left|
|align=left|
|- align=center
|Win
|align=center|11–1||align=left| Ruben Moreno
|
|
|
|align=left|
|align=left|
|- align=center
|Loss
|align=center|10–1||align=left| Beto Nunez
|
|
|
|align=left|
|align=left|
|- align=center
|Win
|align=center|10–0||align=left| Francisco Pico
|
|
|
|align=left|
|align=left|
|- align=center
|Win
|align=center|9–0||align=left| Desi Newbill
|
|
|
|align=left|
|align=left|
|- align=center
|Win
|align=center|8–0||align=left| Ricardo Hurtado
|
|
|
|align=left|
|align=left|
|- align=center
|Win
|align=center|7–0||align=left| Adolfo Hurtado
|
|
|
|align=left|
|align=left|
|- align=center
|Win
|align=center|6–0||align=left| John Papin
|
|
|
|align=left|
|align=left|
|- align=center
|Win
|align=center|5–0||align=left| Ney Santiago
|
|
|
|align=left|
|align=left|
|- align=center
|Win
|align=center|4–0||align=left| Eddie Bracetty
|
|
|
|align=left|
|align=left|
|- align=center
|Win
|align=center|3–0||align=left| Eddie Bracetty
|
|
|
|align=left|
|align=left|
|- align=center
|Win
|align=center|2–0||align=left|Jose Maldonado
|
|
|
|align=left|
|align=left|
|- align=center
|Win
|align=center|1–0||align=left|Roberto Vasquez
|
|
|
|align=left|
|align=left|
|- align=center

Boxing trainer
Roach has trained 27 world champions to date. After his retirement from fighting, Roach worked in a variety of jobs around Las Vegas including telemarketing and a busboy before taking a job with his former trainer and mentor Eddie Futch as an unpaid assistant in 1986. He excelled in his new position and worked as Futch's assistant for five years.

In 1991, actor Mickey Rourke returned to boxing midway through his acting career, and hired Roach to train him in Hollywood, California. In 1995, when Rourke decided to quit boxing, he gave gym equipment to Roach, and it can be found in the Wild Card Boxing Club on Vine Street.

Roach owns the Wild Card Boxing Club in Los Angeles and works alongside his brother Pepper. He is one of the most popular trainers in boxing. Roach's prized ward is eight-division world champion Manny Pacquiao. Roach also once trained Oscar De La Hoya for his May 5, 2007 superfight against Floyd Mayweather Jr. His first world champion was Virgil Hill, whom he took over from his own former trainer, Eddie Futch. He is also the former trainer for British boxers Gary Stretch (former WBC light middleweight champion), training Stretch for his WBO middleweight title challenge against Chris Eubank, and Amir Khan, who became the WBA light welterweight champion on July 18, 2009, and the IBF light welterweight champion on July 23, 2011, under Roach's tutelage. Roach also trains welterweight boxer Zachary "Kid Yamaka" Wohlman among many others.  and can usually be seen nearby when his boxers are interviewed.

In the world of mixed martial arts (MMA), Roach has trained former UFC heavyweight champion Andrei Arlovski and was one of his primary trainers for Arlovski's victory over Ben Rothwell on July 19 at Affliction's inaugural show. He has also trained MMA fighter Dan Hardy for his fight with Marcus Davis at UFC 99 as well as MMA greats, Tito Ortiz, Anderson Silva, and BJ Penn. In May 2010, he began a training engagement with Georges St-Pierre in advance preparation for the fighter's successful UFC welterweight title defense against Josh Koscheck at UFC 124. Roach has also trained many other prominent mixed martial artists, such as: pro-boxer and kickboxer, and former EliteXC lightweight champion, K. J. Noons, Roger Huerta, and Rameau Thierry Sokoudjou. In March 2010, Roach expressed interest in wanting to train former Pride FC and WAMMA heavyweight champion, Fedor Emelianenko.

Parkinson's disease
Roach suffers from Parkinson's disease. As chronicled in the HBO series Real Sports with Bryant Gumbel, he is able to actively control the disease through medication, injections, and his training of boxers. Roach's doctors feel that his active in-ring training routines with his fighters and tremendous eye-hand coordination that he has to exhibit have made it possible to slow the progress of the disease.

Honors
 Inducted into the World Boxing Hall of Fame, "Expanded Category" (Managers & Trainers).
 2006 California Boxing Hall of Fame Inductee (Non-Boxer)
 2003, 2006, 2008, 2009, 2010, 2013 & 2014 Boxing Writers Association of America Trainer of the Year
 2008 World Boxing Council (WBC) "Lifetime Achievement Award"
 2012 International Boxing Hall of Fame, Canastota, New York, United States Non-participant Inductee (Trainer of World Champions)
 2013 Nevada Boxing Hall of Fame Inaugural Inductee ("Trainers" Category)
 2021 USA Boxing Hall of Fame - Fighter, Trainer, Manager

Notable boxers trained

Key

Other people
As of August 1, 2011:

Notable mixed martial artists trained

Key

References

External links
 Wild Card Boxing Club, Hollywood, CA – Freddie Roach
 Arum feud
 
 
 

Boxers from Massachusetts
Sportspeople from Dedham, Massachusetts
People with Parkinson's disease
Lightweight boxers
Super-featherweight boxers
1960 births
Living people
American boxing trainers
American male boxers